The Drover's Wife is a 1945 painting by Australian artist Russell Drysdale. The painting depicts a flat, barren landscape with a woman in a plain dress in the foreground. The drover with his horses and wagon are in the background. The painting has been described as "an allegory of the white Australian people's relationship with this ancient land." Henry Lawson's 1892 short story "The Drover's Wife" is widely seen as an inspiration for the painting, although Drysdale denies that.

The painting is now part of the collection of the National Gallery of Australia in Canberra.

References

Paintings by Russell Drysdale
1945 paintings
Collections of the National Gallery of Australia
Deniliquin
Horses in art